Nikolai Sergeyevich Lebedev (15 December 1921 – 21 August 2022) was a Soviet and Russian actor, People's Artist of Russia in 2018. A former soldier of the Red Army, he also fought in the Second World War, where he was captured by the Wehrmacht, during the Battle of Uman.

Early life and career

Nikolai Sergeyevich Lebedev was born in Moscow on 15 December 1921. During the Great Patriotic War, he was drafted to the Red Army in April 1941, to fight as a private machine gunner. He was contused and captured by the Wehrmacht in July–August 1941, during the Battle of Uman. After his release by the enemy, he was tested by the Soviet counter-intelligence agency, SMERSH, and was ultimately cleared and let go. After the war, he acted at the Moscow Theater of the Young Spectator for two years until deciding to combine his studies and work, entering the Moscow Art Theatre School.

Lebedev graduated from the school in 1950, in the course of Viktor Stanitsyn. As it was known that he had been a prisoner during the war, Lebedev was banned from acting at the Moscow Art Theatre, despite both parties agreeing to it at first. Yuri Zavadsky introduced him to the Mossovet Theater instead, where Lebedev ultimately acted for more than 60 years.

Personal life and death

Lebedev's wife, Anna Kasenkina, was also an actress. They lived together for more than half a century. Anna and Nikolai had no children together, although Kasenkina had a son from her first marriage, whom Lebedev raised as his own. After the death of Anna, he lived with his son's family. 

Lebedev turned 100 in December 2021, and died on 21 August 2022.

Selected filmography

Source:
  (1959) as Colonel Sinitsyn
 Yevdokiya (1961) as Yevdokim
 Silence (1963) as episode
 Liberation (1971) as Sczyapan Krasoŭsky
 Eternal Call (1973) as Mitrofan Savelyev
 Earth and Sky Adventures (1974) as General Designer
 The Captivating Star of Happiness (1975)
 Air Crew (1980) as Professor of Medical Commission
  (1985) as Dwight D. Eisenhower
 Vagrant Bus (1989) as episode
 King Lear (2006) as Doctor

References

Further reading

External links
 

1921 births
2022 deaths
20th-century Russian male actors
21st-century Russian male actors
Male actors from Moscow
Soviet male film actors
Soviet male stage actors
Soviet male television actors
Russian male film actors
Russian male stage actors
Recipients of the Order of Honour (Russia)
People's Artists of Russia
Honored Artists of the RSFSR
Moscow Art Theatre School alumni
Soviet military personnel of World War II
Russian centenarians
Men centenarians
Burials at Vagankovo Cemetery